Bubanj (or as it is often called Bubanj Selo, because the city district of the city of Niš called Bubanj) is a village in the municipality of Palilula, City of Niš, Serbia. According to the 2002 census its population was 516 inhabitants (census 1991st was 441 inhabitants). It is famous for its World War II Bubanj Memorial Park, Historic Landmark of Exceptional Importance.

History
Ceramics of Černa Voda III-culture dating to the Early and Middle Bronze Age have been found in Bubanj.

10,000 people from Niš and south Serbia were shot during World War II in Bubanj. In the memory of the dead a monument, in the shape of three monumental clenched fists, was memorialized in 1963. It is a work of sculptor Ivan Sabolić and symbolizes the resistance of the people during the World War II.

Population
2002: 516
1991: 441

See also 
 Populated places of Serbia
 Bubanj Memorial Park

References

External links
 Niš official website
 Spomenik Database - Bubanj Memorial at Niš historical and informational resource

Niš
Populated places in Nišava District